The 2017 Atlantic 10 Conference baseball tournament will take place from May 24 to 27. The top seven regular season finishers of the league's twelve teams will meet in the double-elimination tournament to be held at Billiken Sports Center, the home field of Saint Louis. The winner will earn the conference's automatic bid to the 2017 NCAA Division I baseball tournament.

Seeding and format
The tournament will use the same format adopted in 2014, with the top seven finishers from the regular season seeded one through seven. The top seed will receive a single bye while remaining seeds will play on the first day.

Results

References

Tournament
Atlantic 10 Conference Baseball Tournament
Atlantic 10 Conference baseball tournament
Atlantic 10 Conference baseball tournament
2010s in St. Louis
College sports tournaments in Missouri
Baseball competitions in St. Louis